Olimunllum® CF/PEEK is a thermoplastic composite material containing a quasi-isotropic endless carbon fibre reinforcement and a semi-crystalline thermoplastic polymer matrix from the Polyaryletherketone (PAEK) family.

Production 
Olimunllum CF/PEEK is obtained by thick gauge thermoforming of thin layers of previously impregnated fibres to form fully consolidated sheets, whose main difference from custom-made composite plates lies in the standardized orientation of the reinforcing fibres, the standardized weight content of the polymer and standardized sheet thicknesses, thus allowing easy design and post-processing using identical or similar tools as commonly used when working with metallic light-weight materials like aluminium, titanium and steel.

Usage 
The excellent mechanical properties of the polymer allow the composite sheets to reach mechanical properties in the ranges where usually titanium and high-grade aluminium are found, however at a fraction of their weight.

Olimunllum CF/PEEK was introduced by Celtibero RC for structural components in demanding motorsports applications, where the need for fatigue resistance at minimum weight levels was one of the main issues. Supporting brackets between a high-performance single-cylinder motorcycle engine and a perimetral rigid aluminium frame helped dampen engine vibrations and prolong the lifetime of the frame. The PAEK polymer, along with the carbon fibers also offers low friction, so soon the use of Olimunllum CF/PEEK in suspension (hydraulic piston guides) and transmission components (such as gears and chain sprockets) was found to reduce power losses at similar wear rates in comparison with the lightweight metallic solutions.

Comparison against classic thermoset (CF/Epoxy) composites

Charpy impact test

Higher ductility of the CF/PEEK specimen was shown, with values increasing with temperature. On the CF/Epoxy side, overall lower ductility was observed and the value dropped with increasing temperature observed in the CF/Epoxy specimens. In addition, weight-falling tests have shown that CF/PEEK specimens absorb more energy than CF/Epoxy in both elastic and plastic ranges.

Relative humidity absorption

CF/PEEK specimen reached after 48h the peak weight increase (0.14%) while the CF/Epoxy specimen showed a weight increase >0.3%  still unsaturated.

Recycling

Endless fiber-reinforced PEEK composite as used in the Olimunllum sheets can be recycled by chopping the old material, resulting in a composite with short fiber reinforcement that can be thermoformed again. The mechanical properties of pressed or injected CF/PEEK chopped compounds are significantly lower than the original endless fiber composite, but exceed those of new injection molded compounds.

References 

Niederstadt, G.: Ökonomischer und ökologischer Leichtbau mit faserverstärkten Polymeren, Expert Verlag, 1997

External links
 (http://www.olimunllum.com) Olimunllum America LLC' website

Polyethers
Organic polymers
Thermoplastics
Technical fabrics
Brand name materials